Hernâni Madruga Neves (born 2 November 1963), known simply as Hernâni, is a retired Portuguese football and beach soccer player. In the former, he played as a defensive midfielder.

He amassed Primeira Liga totals of 84 games and two goals over the course of ten seasons, representing in the competition Vitória de Setúbal and Benfica.

Football career
Hernâni was born in Mourão, Évora District, and began his professional career with Vitória de Setúbal. In a career greatly hampered by injuries he only played one solid season as a professional, 1987–88, appearing in 23 out of 38 matches to help the club finish in eighth position and attracting the attention of Primeira Liga and European Cup runner-up S.L. Benfica, which signed him in the subsequent off-season.

On 4 December 1988, Hernâni scored a rare goal, netting for Benfica in a 2–0 home win against former side Setúbal. A fortnight later, after a 2–0 home success against Lisbon neighbours Sporting Clube de Portugal, he tested positive for cocaine, and received a three-month ban. He was a first-team regular in the latter part of the 1989–90 campaign, and played the whole of the 1990 European Cup Final, lost 1–0 to A.C. Milan; he remained with the club for a further four years, but made only six appearances combined.

After a return to Setúbal, where he played 14 games in two seasons, and a spell in the Segunda Liga with C.D. Beja where he reunited with former Vitória teammate Adelino Nunes, Hernâni retired from the game in June 1997 at age 33. He also earned two caps for Portugal, his debut coming on 5 December 1987 in a 0–3 defeat to Italy in the UEFA Euro 1988 qualifiers.

Beach soccer
One year after retiring, Hernâni started appearing for the Portugal beach soccer team, being one of their leading figures for one full decade and winning a total of 14 titles, as well as many other top-three finishes.

From 2006 to 2009, he also played at club level, with Italian side Cavalieri del Mare di Viareggio.

Football statistics

Honours

Football
Primeira Liga: 1988–89, 1990–91, 1993–94
Taça de Portugal: 1992–93; Runner-up 1988–89
Supertaça Cândido de Oliveira: Runner-up 1993
European Cup: Runner-up 1989–90

Beach soccer

Club
Italian Supercup: 2008

Country
Mundialito: 2003, 2008; Runner-up 1999, 2000, 2001, 2002, 2005, 2006, 2007
FIFA World Cup: 2001; Runner-up 1999, 2002, 2005; Third-place 2003, 2004, 2008
Euro League: 2002, 2007, 2008; Runner-up 2001, 2004, 2005, 2006; Third-place 1999, 2003
Euro League Portuguese Event: 2004, 2005, 2006, 2007
Euro League French Event: 2004, 2005
Euro League Spanish Event: 2005; Runner-up 2006; Third-place 2007
Euro League Italian Event: Runner-up 2005, 2007; Third-place 2006
Copa Latina: 2000; Runner-up 1998, 1999, 2001, 2002, 2003; Third-place 2005
Pro Tour: Runner-up 2001

Individual
FIFA World Cup: MVP 2001
Mundialito: MVP 2004

See also
List of doping cases in sport

References

External links

1963 births
Living people
Portuguese footballers
Association football midfielders
Primeira Liga players
Liga Portugal 2 players
Vitória F.C. players
S.C. Farense players
S.L. Benfica footballers
C.D. Beja players
Portugal international footballers
Portuguese sportspeople in doping cases
Doping cases in association football
Portuguese beach soccer players
Sportspeople from Évora District